Arc-en-Ciel International School is an International Baccalaureate (IB) school in Lome, Togo. It was created in 1986 and offers education from nursery to high school in French and English language tracks to 500 students of more than 40 nationalities.

Arc-en-Ciel was first authorized to offer the IB curriculum in 1999. It offers the IB Diploma Programme for high school, the IB Middle Years Programme for middle school and the IB Primary Years Programme for kindergarten and primary. It is a member of the UNESCO Schools Association and the European Council of International Schools.

The school offers boarding facilities for students age 10 and above.

References

External links
Arc-en-Ciel International School

Schools in Lomé
International schools in Togo
International Baccalaureate schools